Santa Comba Club de Fútbol was a football team based in Santa Comba in the autonomous community of Galicia. Founded in 1980, it merged with Xallas CF in June 2012 to form Xallas de Santa Comba CF. The club's played home games in A Fontenla, which has a capacity of 3,000 spectators.

Season to season

6 seasons in Tercera División

References

External links
senafutbolmarin.blogspot.com.es profile
Futbolme.com profile

Football clubs in Galicia (Spain)
Association football clubs established in 1980
Association football clubs disestablished in 2012
Defunct football clubs in Galicia
1980 establishments in Spain